Gayle Day is British, Los Angeles-based, singer-songwriter. She is also one of the co-producers and directors of the Los Angeles Women's Music Festival.

Overview
Day has released two albums, Freedom Paradise and Beautiful Dangerous, and placed music on numerous television programmes including most recently The Hills. She is also a co-founder of LaLa Music. and runs the Day/Lee Show with fellow expatriate Eileen Lee.

In 2007, Gayle and Miria, with Gilli Moon's Warrior Girl Music, co-produced the Los Angeles Women's Music Festival, the first festival of its kind in the Los Angeles area.

In addition to being a producer and performer at the first Los Angeles Women's Music Festival, Day was pregnant during the Festival, and gave birth to a daughter in May 2008.

References

External links
Gayle Day official website
Los Angeles Women's Music Festival official website

Year of birth missing (living people)
Place of birth missing (living people)
Living people
British women singer-songwriters
Musicians from Los Angeles